On 11 January 2013, the French military launched an unsuccessful operation in Bulo Marer, Lower Shabelle, Somalia to rescue French hostage Denis Allex from the militant Islamist organization al-Shabaab. Allex was executed in response,  and two French commandos, at least 17 Islamist militants and at least eight civilians were killed in the firefight.

Background 
Denis Allex and Marc Aubrière were deployed to Mogadishu, Somalia in 2009 by the French Directorate-General for External Security (DGSE) to train soldiers from the Transitional Federal Government. On 14 July 2009, both men were kidnapped from the hotel at which they were staying by armed men impersonating police. The captors loaded the men into a truck and left the hotel, but later the truck broke down. While the truck was incapacitated, the captors were confronted by members of Hizbul Islam, a Somali Islamist militia, who demanded custody of the hostages. The two men were then taken away by fighters from Hizbul Islam and later Allex was transferred to the allied militia, al-Shabaab.

On 25 August 2009, according to his version of events, Aubrière, who was being held in Mogadishu, escaped from his captors in the middle of the night while they slept. He then walked for five hours to the Somali government compound in the city and, from there, was transported back to France. However, Aubrière's account was disputed by many Somalis as being improbable and it was suggested by them that his release was secured after the French government paid a ransom; they said they did not.

US and French technical and human intelligence teams, including a US Army Special Mission Unit specialized in signals intelligence, and U-28A surveillance flights from Djibouti were immediately deployed in an exhaustive effort to locate the hostage. Somali assets recruited by the DGSE identified several locations where the agent had been; the agent was constantly moved by the terrorists mainly because of the fighting between al-Shabaab and African Union troops. US and French satellites and unmanned reconnaissance flights monitored the hostage's location for several months as operators from DGSE Division Action unit planned the rescue mission.

In December 2012, when news reached the DGSE that the hostage's health was deteriorating, President François Hollande ordered the DGSE Division Action to prepare to carry out a previously opposed hostage rescue mission. The DGSE sent a 50-man Close Quarter Battle Group of the Division Action (known as CPIS) to Camp Lemonnier where they trained for the mission with a small team of United States Navy SEALs from Red squadron, DEVGRU. In addition to the latest intelligence from Somali agents, the US also provided surveillance assets, including a JSOC Predator UAV based at Camp Lemonnier and air cover from both AC-130 Spectres and an RQ-4 Global Hawk UAV during the mission itself.

Operation 
At around 2:00a.m. local time on 11 January 2013, 50 French Special Forces from the DGSE's highly secretive direct-action unit called "Division Action" supported by EC-725 Caracal helicopters dispatched from the Mistral, assaulted an al-Shabaab position in Bulo Marer, Somalia, where Denis Allex was believed to be held. A fierce firefight lasting 45 minutes ensued and in the process 17 al-Shabaab fighters and two French soldiers were killed. The French Special Forces later abandoned the operation.

The French military believes that members of al-Shabaab executed Allex during the operation. However, al-Shabaab claimed that Allex was still alive and in its custody.

Additionally, the French military had reported that one soldier was missing; they were almost certain he was killed during the attack. Al-Shabaab claimed that it had captured the missing soldier, left lying wounded on the ground during the firefight, despite also releasing photographs of the dead soldier. In addition to the military casualties, eight civilians were also reportedly killed during the operation, including a pregnant woman, with others being wounded.

According to the French journalist , more than 70 Somali militiamen were killed and several dozen civilians were victims of a 'clean-up' carried out by French commandos to preserve the surprise effect of the operation.

Aftermath
On 13 January 2013, the Somali Federal Government held a press conference, where it condemned the Bulo Marer operation as unilateral and carried out without the knowledge or consent of the Somali authorities. The officials also extended their condolences to all casualties.

The following day, US President Barack Obama indicated in a War Powers Resolution letter to Congress that US Air Force warplanes had entered Somali airspace in limited support of the French rescue operation. However, he stated that they did not use weapons during the raid.

On 14 January 2013, al-Shabaab posted on their Twitter account a picture of the body of a white man in military uniform, describing him as the "leader" of the failed French commando raid in Somalia. The body was surrounded by captured military gear. This was confirmed to be the soldier missing in action. This soldier has yet to be identified.  Three days later, Al-Shabaab announced, also through Twitter, that Allex had been executed in response to the French operation.

See also 
 Foreign hostages in Somalia
 Rescue of Jessica Buchanan and Poul Hagen Thisted

References

2013 murders in Somalia
2013 mass shootings in Africa
2013 in international relations
January 2013 crimes in Africa
January 2013 events in Africa
Battles in 2013
Terrorist incidents in Somalia in 2013
Al-Shabaab (militant group) activities
Battles involving France
Battles involving the United States
Foreign hostages in Somalia
Hostage rescue operations
Mass shootings in Somalia
Somali Civil War (2009–present)
Directorate-General for External Security
French intelligence operations
France–Somalia relations
France–United States military relations
Somalia–United States relations
Lower Shabelle